The Monster Maker is a 1944 science-fiction horror film starring J. Carrol Naish and Ralph Morgan. Albert Glasser supplied the film score, his first, an assignment for which he was paid US$250.

Plot
Dr. Markoff (J. Carrol Naish) has concocted a formula that spreads acromegaly, a hideous disease that extends bones and distorts facial features. Markoff has no moral dilemma in experimenting on unsuspecting human subjects. His amoral behavior assumes monstrous dimensions when famed concert pianist Lawrence (Ralph Morgan) is injected with the doctor's disease-inducing serum. In return for an antidote, Markoff intends to exact more than his pound of flesh by extorting a fortune from Lawrence and demanding the hand of the musician's pretty daughter Patricia (Wanda McKay).

Cast

 J. Carrol Naish as Dr. Igor Markoff 
 Ralph Morgan as Anthony Lawrence
 Tala Birell as Maxine
 Wanda McKay as Patricia Lawrence 
 Terry Frost as Bob Blake 
 Glenn Strange as Giant / Steve
 Alexander Pollard as Butler / Stack
 Sam Flint as Dr. Adams
 Ace the Wonder Dog as Ace

Production and reception
Lowly PRC hadn't released a horror picture in nearly 17 months, having spent most of 1943 substantially expanding their  capabilities by purchasing the bankrupt Chadwick Studio (a poverty row operation that specialized in renting stages and production equipment to low-budget producers along Gower) for $305,000. While critics, what few that would review a PRC release, complained about the film's lack of action, production values were noted to be somewhat higher than earlier releases. The working title of this film was The Devil's Apprentice.

The film holds an extremely low 3% on Rotten Tomatoes and a 4.7/10 on the Internet Movie Database.

See also
 List of films in the public domain in the United States

References

External links 

 
 
 

1944 horror films
1944 films
American science fiction horror films
American black-and-white films
Mad scientist films
American monster movies
Producers Releasing Corporation films
1940s science fiction horror films
Fictional companies
Films scored by Albert Glasser
1940s English-language films
Films directed by Sam Newfield
1940s American films